Hada are a branch of the Chauhan Rajput community. They live in Hadoti and once ruled the states of Bundi, Jhalawar and Kota.

History 

They belong to Agnikul. Hada Chauhan's claim descent from Bisaldev Chauhan, son of Harshraj and grandson of Manik Rai of Sambhar (Rajasthan), who was a descendant of Anal Chauhan. His progeny was Anuraj who reigned at Hansi and he defeated Sabutkegin, they ruled at Hansi in times of Jaipal Taur of Delhi. and a branch ruled at Goval-kund (Golkonda), later driven out by Pathans. They conquered Asir in times of Ashtipal Chauhan, Asir was lost to raids of Mahmud Gazni. Chandkarn was son of Asthipal and his sons Hamirdeo and Gambhir Chauhan were generals of Prithviraj Chauhan. Hamirgarh at Ranthambor was amongst the regional dominating powers before It was later overrun by the armies of Alauddin Khilji. 

Later the region was governed by Rao Deva, who took over Bundi from Jaita Meena in 1242, renaming the surrounding area as Haravati or Haroti. Bundi and the eponymous princely state are said to derive their names from a former Meena King called Bunda Meena. Bundi was previously called "Bunda-Ka-Nal", Nal meaning "narrow ways". Bundi is situated in a narrow valley within the Aravalli Hills in Rajasthan. Later, in the early 17th century, during the reign of the Mughal Emperor Jahangir, the ruler of Bundi – Rao Ratan Singh, gave the smaller principality of Kota to his son, Madho Singh. Since then Kota became a hallmark of the Rajput gallantry and culture. Kota became an independent state in 1631 when Rao Madho Singh, the second son of Rao Ratan of [Bundi] was made the ruler, by the Mughal Emperor Jahangir. It later became vessel to the British till india was declared independent. Later Hadas were rulers of Bundi at their capital in Ranthambhore Fort which finally fell to Akbar in 1569 during the Mughal Siege of Ranthambore (1568).

References 

Rajput clans of Rajasthan